NZR B class may refer to:

 NZR B class (1874)
 NZR B class (1899)